John Denis (born February 3, 1998) is an American soccer player who plays for New York City FC II in the MLS Next Pro.

Playing career

Youth
In 2009, Denis joined local youth side New York Soccer Club. By 2015 he had moved to another youth club, Beachside SC, with whom he played in the USSDA league, at both under-16 and under-18 level. At the end of the 2015–16 season he was nominated to the East Conference team of the year.

College
In 2016, Denis attended Columbia University to play college soccer. Over four years he played a total of 64 games, scoring 19 goals.

Senior
In 2018, while still studying at college, Denis was offered the chance to play for New York Red Bulls U-23 in the Premier Development League. He would eventually feature for them 13 times, scoring 5 times.

After graduating, Denis joined the New York Cosmos of the NISA in July 2020. He would ultimately make only three substitute appearances in the course of the 2020 season.

John Denis would then move to another local NISA club, New Amsterdam FC. With New Amsterdam he was a little more successful, being given six starts in which he would score one goal.

On March 24, 2022, it was announced that Denis had signed with MLS Next Pro side New York City FC II ahead of the league's inaugural season. On March 27 he scored the team's first ever competitive goal, netting in the 9th minute against New England Revolution II in a game which would ultimately be lost on penalties.

International career
In January 2016, while still playing for youth team Beachside SC, Denis was called up by former national team goalkeeper Brad Friedel to the United States under-19 team to participate in the Copa del Atlantico. He featured once for the team, appearing as a substitute in a loss to Spain.

Career statistics
.

References 

1998 births
American soccer players
Association football forwards
Living people
Columbia Lions men's soccer players
New York Cosmos (2010) players
New Amsterdam FC players
New York City FC II players
National Independent Soccer Association players
MLS Next Pro players
Soccer players from New York (state)